Guinness World Records Gone Wild, also known as Guinness World Records Unleashed, is an American reality television series on truTV. The series debuted on February 7, 2013 and is hosted by Dan Cortese. The series' first season averaged more than 1.3 million viewers and ranked as one of ad-supported cable's Top 3 programs in the Thursday 8 p.m. timeslot with key adult and male demos. It was also cable's No.1 unscripted entertainment program in the timeslot with men 18-49 and adults 18-34. It was announced in April 2013 that truTV has ordered an additional ten episodes. Season 2 premiered on November 7, 2013, and features a title change to Guinness World Records Unleashed.

Premise
The series features average citizens who attempt at breaking records which could allow them to be in the Guinness Book of World Records. Stuart Claxton, Liz Smith and Zach Selwyn are recurring cast members in the series. Claxton is the primary Guinness World Records adjudicator for the series, Smith also works with Guinness World Records and Selwyn will provide commentary. Each stunt is performed in front of a live studio audience.

Episodes

Season 1 (2013)

Season 2 (2013)

References

2010s American reality television series
2013 American television series debuts
English-language television shows
TruTV original programming
Guinness World Records